is the seventh Japanese single by South Korean girl group Kara. It was released on October 17, 2012. The song is featured on the soundtrack of the third Japanese edition of Just Dance Wii.

Background
The single was announced by Universal Sigma and on Kara's official Japanese website on September 21, with the track list of the single, jacket covers and prices of every edition. The single was released in four different types, three limited editions: a CD+DVD edition including the CD single with the standard track list and a DVD including the music video of the song, a Close-Up version and behind the scenes from the music video, a CD+Photobook edition including the CD single with the standard track list and a 28-page photobook and a first press edition from the CD only edition including only the CD single itself with a bonus track, the original version of the song "Pandora", and a Regular edition, including only the CD single itself with the standard track list. All limited editions comes with a lottery ticket for the hand-shake event, to be held in October 21.

In October 3, it was announced that the group will make a special DJ launch event in October 17, day of the single's release, in a somewhere part of Tokyo and a hand-shake event in October 21 in Tokyo Big Sight.

Composition
"Electric Boy" was written by Shalamon Baskin, Mikko Tamminen, Line Krogholm, Faya and Emyli and produced by Mikko Tamminen. "Orion", the single's b-side, was solely written and composed by Simon Isogai. He also composed the songs "Winter Magic" and "Ima, Okuritai 「Arigatō」" for the group. The bonus track, "Pandora", is a Korean song released on the group's fifth mini album of same name. It was written by Song Soo-yun and composed by Yue, Kim Seung-soo and Han Jae-ho.

Music video
A 1-minute teaser of the music video of "Electric Boy" was released on Universal Music Japan's YouTube account on September 27, 2012. The full music video premiered on the TV channel Space Shower TV Plus two days later, on September 29.

Track listing

Chart performance

Oricon chart

Billboard charts

Sales and certifications

Release history

References

External links
 

2012 singles
Japanese-language songs
Kara (South Korean group) songs
Dance-pop songs
Billboard Japan Hot 100 number-one singles
2012 songs